Ephraim Carroll (1753 – 1824) was an Irish politician.

Carroll was born in Dublin and educated at Trinity College, Dublin.

Carroll represented Fethard in the Irish House of Commons between 1783 and 1790, before sitting for Bannow from 1790 to 1799.

References

1753 births
1824 deaths
Irish MPs 1783–1790
Irish MPs 1790–1797
Members of the Parliament of Ireland (pre-1801) for County Wexford constituencies
Politicians from Dublin (city)
Alumni of Trinity College Dublin